Cokeworthy is a surname. Notable people with the surname include:

 John Cokeworthy (disambiguation), multiple people
 Ralph Cokeworthy, MP for Liskeard (UK Parliament constituency)